Girl on Fire is the fifth studio album by American singer and songwriter Alicia Keys. It was released on November 22, 2012, being Keys' first release with RCA Records following Sony Music Entertainment's decision to close J Records during a company reshuffle. The album is an R&B album with elements of different musical styles, including rock, electro, reggae and hip hop. It features a largely minimalist production, includes piano-driven songs and balances traditional R&B with atypical chords and melodic changes.

Upon its release, Girl on Fire received generally positive reviews from music critics. The album debuted at number one on the Billboard 200 with 159,000 copies sold in its first week. It produced five singles–"Girl on Fire" (which peaked at number two on Hot R&B/Hip-Hop Songs and number 11 on the US Billboard Hot 100), "Brand New Me", "New Day", "Fire We Make" (featuring Maxwell), and "Tears Always Win". To further promote the album, Keys embarked on her fifth worldwide concert tour, titled Set the World on Fire Tour, which commenced in March 2013 and ended in December. At the 56th Annual Grammy Awards, Girl on Fire won Best R&B Album, making Keys the most awarded artist in this category, with three wins.

Background and development 
Girl on Fire is Keys' fifth studio album and the follow-up to The Element of Freedom (2009). It also serves as her first release under RCA Records, after a reorganization at parent company Sony Music Entertainment led to her previous label J Records being absorbed into RCA. Between the two albums, Keys married record producer and rapper Swizz Beatz, became a mother, began co-managing her own career, produced and directed both a Broadway play and short film, in addition to designing a line of trainers for Reebok. Keys had also either appeared on or produced material for several other artists, including work on Kanye West, Emeli Sandé and Miguel's albums. Essence reported that Keys began working on Girl on Fire in February 2011. Speaking on how the events of the previous three years inspired her, during an interview with Billboard, Keys stated: "These last three years have been the most in every way. The most newest, the most difficult, the most loving, the most dream-filled, the most breaking free . . . an entire crazy dynamic of lessons and emotions to grow into and claim. This whirlwind has definitely forced me to be who I am, to be free enough and brave enough to just not accept anything else-nor try to be anything else."

Speaking on how Girl on Fire was different to The Element of Freedom, Keys said: "I've stepped more into my business and really... taken control for how I want that to be. So every way that I've created now is totally in a new space. It's more in a true space of who I am and what story it is that I'm trying to tell, what it is I'm going through, what the world is going through. And it's really important for me to describe that and say that exactly how I see it, period. So, things are just new. The world is new! Everything feels like brand new to me." Keys even explained that the album title is a slight reference to Katniss Everdeen, the central character in the adventure novel series The Hunger Games, of which she is a fan.

Recording and production 
Recording sessions for the album took place at Jungle City Studios and Oven Studios in New York, Chalice Studios and The Record Plant in Los Angeles, Geejam Studios in Jamaica, and Metropolis Studios in London. Keys worked with a range of producers for Girl on Fire, including husband Swizz Beatz, Babyface, Kerry Brothers, Jr. and Jeff Bhasker among others. When working on the album, Keys said she was not inspired by the current rhythmic trends in pop music. "I was really focused on writing, on the crafting of a song, more so than anything else. I didn't care about a beat. I didn't care about a hot track. I didn't even want to hear those things. I wanted to create a song." During a Keep a Child Alive concert in New York City, Keys met blues-rock guitarist Gary Clark, Jr. Keys had initially asked Clark, Jr. if he would play the guitar elements from "While My Guitar Gently Weeps" by George Harrison. Seeing potential in Clark, Jr.'s skills, Keys would present him with the song "Fire We Make" and asked him if he could play some guitar on the track. Speaking about the collaboration he said, "I went in and I was like, 'What do you want me to do?' and she was like, 'This is the song. You just do what you do, and we'll see what happens.' It was one of the best studio experiences I've ever had."

Music and lyrics 
An R&B album, Girl on Fire has a balance of conventional R&B songs and piano ballads. The album's music is typified by Keys' heightened singing, piano playing, and a minimalist production. It also showcases her attempt at different styles, which range from electro soul and hip hop, to rock and reggae flourishes. The songs are mostly midtempo and feature unconventional chords and melodic changes.

The album's lyrics features aphorisms about relationships and God. A portion of the album's songs have their narrator examining and struggling with a stifling relationship, while others touch on Keys' recent personal life, including marriage and motherhood. Pitchfork Media's Stephen M. Deusner views Girl on Fire as an album "about rebirth and renewal", writing that Keys "use[s] romantic tragedy as the engine for transformation." James Reed of The Boston Globe writes that its "emphasis on looking inward recalls the mood of Beyoncé's 4."

The quiet opening track "De Novo Adagio", which translates to adagio again, exhibits Keys' classically trained musicianship. "Listen to Your Heart" is one of the album's uptempo songs, taking a more dancier direction than Keys' previous material. "Brand New Me", a slow-burning declaration of the narrator's independence, was penned with Scottish singer-songwriter Emeli Sandé, as an autobiographical snapshot of Keys' life. Sandé also helped Keys' write the songs "Not Even the King" and "101". On "Brand New Me", Keys sings about finally taking control over a domineering partner. "Not Even the King" is a piano-driven song about "rich love" which is bigger than the entire world, where Keys sings: "They offer the world to have what we got, but I found the world in you."

Release and promotion 

In early September 2012, the audio for the song "Not Even the King" was uploaded to Keys' official Vevo channel. On September 24, Keys performed an exclusive set for a MTV event called MTV Crashes Manchester. The set, which took place outside the City Cathedral in Manchester, included a variety of songs from her discography, as well as songs from Girl on Fire. On September 28, she performed several new tracks from the album as well as older hits at the iTunes Festival. On October 16, Keys performed her set at the "City Advantage Love the Journey Concert" at Lincoln Center's Avery Fisher Hall in New York City. On November 12, Keys was featured on an episode of VH1 Storytellers, where she performed both old and new material. Josh Stillman of Entertainment Weekly praised her appearance on the show as a whole: "She carries herself onstage with cool and confidence – not showy or attention-seeking, merely comfortable – and speaks in a voice so smooth you could drape it over your shoulders." He noted that Keys was backed by a six-piece band for songs such as "No One" and "If I Ain't Got You", but stripped the mood down for the "passionate solo renditions" of "Not Even the King" and "Brand New Me".

On November 18, 2012, Keys performed "Girl on Fire" on The X Factor results show. On November 20, Keys streamed a Google+ Hangout on her official YouTube channel live from her studio, to give fans a "guided tour" of the album. When announcing the session, she stated: "hear all the songs on the record [and] I'll be able to share my creative process and also tell you some of the very special and important meanings behind some of the songs." Girl on Fire was released in the United States on November 27, as her first album released by RCA Records. In November 2012, following her performance on The X Factor, Keys announced an eight-date UK and Ireland arena tour, which took place in 2013. Keys also said that she would tour with Miguel beginning in March 2013. On January 10, 2013, Keys announced that she would embark on the Set the World on Fire Tour in North America; tickets went on sale on January 14.

Singles 
The album's title song was unveiled on September 4, 2012, as the lead single. Recorded as a three-part suite, "Girl on Fire" was accompanied by its "Inferno" version featuring rapper Nicki Minaj and a "Bluelight" remix featuring Keys singing the song in a stripped-back production. The song was composed by Keys, Jeff Bhasker and Salaam Remi. Rock guitarist Billy Squier is also credited as a writer due to "Girl on Fire" including a music sample of the drum track from his song "The Big Beat" (1980). Keys performed the song for the first time at the 2012 MTV Video Music Awards on September 6, 2012, being joined by Minaj and the 2012 Summer Olympics gymnastics gold medalist Gabby Douglas, who made a special appearance during the performance. In the United States, "Girl on Fire" peaked at number two on the Hot R&B/Hip-Hop Songs and number 11 on the Billboard Hot 100.

On November 19, "Brand New Me", which was co-written with Scottish singer-songwriter Emeli Sandé, impacted the urban adult contemporary radio in the United States as the album's second single.

"New Day" served as the album's third single for international markets only, being sent to radio stations in France on February 21, 2013, in Australia on May 17, and finally in the United Kingdom on May 29.

"Fire We Make", Keys' duet with Maxwell, was serviced to US urban adult contemporary radio stations on March 28 as the fourth single.

The album's fifth single "Tears Always Win" was released for digital download via iTunes Store on May 7. Keys performed the song on American Idol on May 9.

Critical reception 

Girl on Fire received generally positive reviews from  critics. At Metacritic, which assigns a normalized rating out of 100 to reviews from mainstream publications, the album received an average score of 69, based on 25 reviews. In Rolling Stone, Jody Rosen called Keys a musical "iconoclast" and Girl on Fire "both her catchiest and subtlest album yet – and one of the best R&B records of 2012." Uncut wrote in its review, "Her technical brilliance remains stunning; it's now matched by her maturity and modernity." Will Hodgkinson of The Times wrote that the album "works by combining odd modern touches with a classic songwriting sensibility." Helen Brown from The Daily Telegraph felt that, although "the powerful simplicity of her lyrics" occasionally "tends toward the trite", the album "does at least see her classily smouldering and occasionally ablaze." Andrew Hampp of Billboard felt that it is "low on the filler" of some of Keys' previous albums and dubbed it "arguably [her] most consistent album to date." Melissa Maerz of Entertainment Weekly wrote that "the music feels surprisingly intimate" when Keys plays her piano-based songs rather than the "jazzy smoothfests". Robert Christgau said Girl on Fire was "heartfelt, lively, and sweet—as r&b maturity statements go", while naming the title track and "One Thing" as its highlights. He gave it a two-star honorable mention in his column for MSN Music, indicating a "likable effort consumers attuned to its overriding aesthetic or individual vision may well enjoy".

In a mixed review, Ben Ratliff of The New York Times observed "so many clichés" and critiqued that the songs with Keys' personal "subtext ... quickly grow trite, in words and music." Dave Simpson of The Guardian wrote that, "as a reinvention, the album doesn't go far enough, and there are some underwhelming tunes". Simon Price of The Independent found it to be "dominated by navel-gazing auto-therapy sessions" and asserted, "What it lacks, ironically, is fire." Slant Magazines Eric Henderson found the album to be "less a portrait of Keys's womanhood at a crossroads as it is another extension of a career spent predominantly navigating straight down the middle of the road." Greg Kot of the Chicago Tribune felt that, like her previous albums, Keys still "keeps her guard up and the listener at arm’s length." Kitty Empire of The Observer quipped, "she's supposed to be on fire here, not just warming the piano stool", while Mikael Wood of the Los Angeles Times viewed it as another "collection of handsomely crafted, gorgeously sung ballads interrupted by several overworked anthems about the value of perseverance."

Accolades 

|-
! scope="row"| 2012
| La chanson de l'année
| Song of the Year
| rowspan="2"| "Girl on Fire"
| 
| 
|-
! scope="row" rowspan="3"| 2013
| rowspan="3"| NAACP Image Award
| Outstanding Music Video
| 
| rowspan="3"| 
|-
| Outstanding Album
| Girl on Fire
| 
|-
| Outstanding Female Artist
| Alicia Keys
| 
|-
! scope="row" rowspan="3"| 2013
| International Dance Music Award
| Best R&B/Urban Dance Track
| rowspan="2"| "Girl on Fire"
| 
| 
|-
| rowspan="2"| RTHK International Pop Poll Award
| Top Ten International Gold Songs
| 
| rowspan="2"| 
|-
| Top Female Artist
| rowspan="2"| Alicia Keys
| 
|-
! scope="row" rowspan="3"| 2013
| rowspan="3"| Billboard Music Award
| Billboard Music Award for Top R&B Artist
| 
| rowspan="3"| 
|-
| Top R&B Album
| Girl on Fire
| 
|-
| Top R&B Song
| rowspan="4"| "Girl on Fire"
| 
|-
! scope="row" rowspan="2"| 2013
| rowspan="2"| MTV Video Music Award Japan
| Best Female Video
| 
| rowspan="2"| 
|-
| Best R&B Video
| 
|-
! scope="row"| 2013
| BMI Urban Award
| Most Performed Song
| 
| 
|-
! scope="row" rowspan="3"| 2013
| rowspan="3"| Soul Train Music Award
| Best R&B/Soul Female Artist
| Alicia Keys
| 
| rowspan="3"| 
|-
| The Ashford & Simpson Songwriter's Award
| rowspan="2"| "Fire We Make"
| 
|-
| Best Collaboration
| 
|-
! scope="row"| 2014
| TEC Award
| Outstanding Creative Achievement – Record Production/Album
| rowspan="2"| Girl on Fire
| 
| 
|-
! scope="row"| 2014
| Grammy Award
| Best R&B Album
| 
| 
|-
! scope="row" rowspan="3"| 2014
| rowspan="3"| NAACP Image Award
| Outstanding Song
| rowspan="3"| "Fire We Make"
| 
| rowspan="3"| 
|-
| Outstanding Music Video
| 
|-
| Outstanding Duo, Group or Collaboration
| 
|-
! scope="row"| 2014
| ASCAP Rhythm & Soul Award
| Award Winning R&B/Hip-Hop Song
| "Girl on Fire"
| 
| 
|}

Commercial performance 
In the United States, Girl on Fire debuted at number one the US Billboard 200 chart, selling 159,000 copies in its first week. It became Keys' fifth number-one album on the chart but also registered Keys' lowest first-week sales for an album–her previous album, The Element of Freedom (2009), had opened to sales of 417,000 units, "buoyed by its week-before Christmas release date". In its second week, Girl on Fire dropped to number seven on the chart, selling an additional 77,000 copies. In its third week, the album fell to number nine, selling 61,000 more copies. On August 11, 2020, the album was certified platinum by the Recording Industry Association of America (RIAA) for combined sales and album-equivalent units of one million units in the United States.
 
In the United Kingdom, the album debuted at number 15 on the UK Albums Chart and number two on the UK R&B Albums Chart, selling 31,675 copies in its first week. In Australia, it debuted at number 12 on the ARIA Albums Chart and number two on the ARIA Urban Albums Chart. Upon the release of Girl on Fire in South Korea, the entire album charted on the Gaon International Singles Chart: "Tears Always Win" debuted at number one, "Not Even the King" at number 24, "Girl on Fire" (Inferno Version, featuring Nicki Minaj) at number 46, "That When I Knew" and "Brand New Me" at numbers 50 and 51, respectively, "One Thing" at 56, "Fire We Make" (with Maxwell) at number 64, "New Day" at number 66, "Listen to Your Heart" at number 68, "When Its All Over" at number 72, "Limitedless" at number 82, "De Novo Adagio (Intro)" at number 84 and "101" at number 87. According to the International Federation of the Phonographic Industry (IFPI), Girl on Fire was the 32nd best-selling album worldwide of 2012 with sales of 1.3 million copies.

Track listing 

Sample credits
"Girl on Fire" contains a sample from the drum track from Billy Squier's 1980 song "The Big Beat".

Personnel 
Credits adapted from the liner notes of Girl on Fire.

Musicians

 Alicia Keys – concept, CP-70 piano, keyboards, Moog synthesizer, piano, synthesizers, background vocals, vocals
 Jeff Bhasker – drum programming, keyboards , organ, piano 
 Andre Brissett – keyboards 
 Gary Clark, Jr. – electric guitar 
 Antonio Dixon – drum programming 
 Kenneth "Babyface" Edmonds – acoustic guitar, bass guitar 
 Warren "Oak" Felder – drum programming, keyboard programming 
 Emile Haynie – drum programming 
 James "Malay" Ho – acoustic guitar, bass guitar, drum programming, electric guitar  
 Rodney "Darkchild" Jerkins – drum programming, keyboard programming 
 Billy Kraven – background vocals 
 Trevor Lawrence Jr. – drum programming 
 Bruno Mars – background vocals, bass, guitar 
 Steve Mostyn – bass guitar 
 Phillip Lawrence – background vocals 
 Salaam Remi – drum programming 
 Lenford "Brutus" Richards – electric guitar 
 Davide Rossi – string arrangement, strings 
 Jamie Smith – drum and synth programming 
 Amber "Sevyn" Streeter – background vocals 
 Andrew "Pop" Wansel – drum programming 
 Dylan Wissing – drums 

Additional personnel
 Michelangelo Di Battista – photography
 David S. Blanco – design, layout
 Erwin Gorostiza – creative director
 Simon Henwood – creative director, design, layout, logo design
 Steffan McMillan – design, layout
 Nino Muñoz – photography

Technical personnel
 Alicia Keys – executive producer, producer
 Jeff Bhasker – producer
 Antonio Dixon – producer
 Dr. Dre – producer
 Kenneth "Babyface" Edmonds – producer
 James "Malay" Ho – producer
 Rodney "Darkchild" Jerkins – producer
 Pop & Oak – producer 
 Salaam Remi – producer
 Jamie Smith – producer
 Swizz Beatz – producer
 Val Brathwaite – assistant engineer, engineer, project assistant
 Paul Boutin – engineer
 Ghazi Hourani – assistant engineer
 Chad Jolley – vocal engineer
 Ken Lewis – engineer
 Jared Lynch – assistant engineer
 Take Mendez – assistant engineer
 Ann Mincieli – coordination, engineer, mixing
 Paul Norris – assistant engineer
 Ramon Rivas – assistant engineer, engineer, project assistant
 Miki Tsutsumi – assistant engineer
 Michelle Mancini – mastering assistant
 Chris Galland – mixing assistant
 Justin Hergett – mixing assistant
 James Krause – mixing assistant
 Manny Marroquin – mixing
 Tony Maserati – mixing
 Greg Morgan – sound design
 David Kutch – mastering

Charts

Weekly charts

Year-end charts

Certifications

Release history

See also 
 List of Billboard 200 number-one albums of 2012
 List of Billboard number-one R&B albums of 2012

References

External links 
 Official website 
 Girl on Fire at AnyDecentMusic?

2012 albums
Alicia Keys albums
Albums produced by Babyface (musician)
Albums produced by Jeff Bhasker
Albums produced by Dr. Dre
Albums produced by Jamie xx
Albums produced by Rodney Jerkins
Albums produced by Alicia Keys
Albums produced by Malay (record producer)
Albums produced by Salaam Remi
Albums produced by the Smeezingtons
Albums produced by Swizz Beatz
Grammy Award for Best R&B Album
RCA Records albums
Albums produced by Oak Felder